Dr Liang Wern Fook (born 1964 in Singapore) is a Cantonese Singaporean writer, musician, singer and researcher in Chinese literature and pedagogy. He was one of the pioneer figures in xinyao (Singaporean Chinese folk songs) movement in the 1980s and 1990s.

Biography

Early life
Liang grew up in a music-loving household, along with his two younger siblings. His father, a journalist, and his mother, an acupuncturist, were always playing the records of singers like Bai Guang and Zhou Xuan.

Liang received his primary and secondary school education at Catholic High School. He started taking piano lessons at the age of 10, and went on to attain a Grade 8 certificate. Liang wrote his first song at the age of 16, and he became more prolific once he started attending Hwa Chong Junior College (now Hwa Chong Institution), often performing with schoolmates in addition to heading the student council and Chinese society drama club. Many of the songs he wrote then, mainly about friendship and camaraderie, are still popular among the school's students today during gatherings, where different singing groups would often perform together.

Liang later attended the National University of Singapore, where he was the top student for both his major, Chinese studies, and in the Arts faculty in 1988. He graduated with a Bachelor of Arts with Honours in Chinese Literature in 1989 and a Master of Arts in 1992 from the National University of Singapore. In 1999, he received his Ph.D. in Chinese Studies from the Nanyang Technological University.

In 1992, he married Liu Xiu Mei, a former Chinese language teacher of The Chinese High School, whom he met in university. They have no children.

Musical and writing career
As a singer-songwriter, Liang's first song "Sing a Song for Hwa Chong" was written in 1981 after he lost in an inter-school debating competition at Hwa Chong Junior College. His first commercial song, "A Song for You" was released in 1984 on the Ocean Butterflies label.  During his xinyao phase from 1986 to 1992, he released five albums, some of which sold as many as 20,000 copies. Among these, Door was the first Singaporean Mandarin album to be completely composed and written by the same artiste. The song "One Step at a Time" sat for six weeks at the top of the charts in 1987, while "Love's Refuge" was at the top for 29 weeks in 1986, an unbroken record for a local pop song. To date, Liang has over 200 musical compositions and songs to his name.

Liang's particularly iconic composition is the song "Negotiations And Love". He penned this in the aftermath of the 1989 Tiananmen Square protests and massacre, and Taiwanese singer Wen Zhang recorded it. The song became popular in Singapore, Taiwan and mainland China.

He has composed television serial theme songs for the then Singapore Broadcasting Corporation, now MediaCorp. Since the 1990s, Liang has also written hits for Cantonese and Mandarin pop stars such as Jacky Cheung, Andy Lau, Leon Lai, Tony Leung, Alex To, Eric Moo, Kit Chan, Joi Chua and Stefanie Sun. In 1996, he wrote and composed the songs for Singapore's first Chinese musical December Rains. In the following year, Liang wrote the theme song "Are You Still There" (你是不是还在) for Singapore film Track. In August and September 2007, Liang's songs were featured in a local Chinese musical "If There're Seasons", presented by The Theatre Practice.

In April 2015, Liang held his 1st solo concert For Music, For Life... Liang Wenfu Concert 2015 at The Star Theatre.

Liang is also a poet, essayist and a former columnist for Lianhe Zaobao. He has over ten publications in various genres of creative writing. His works, such as the essay collection, The Last Years of Kreta Ayer (1998)- which is also used as a GCE A Level text in Singapore; poetry collection In Fact I am in Love with Time (1989); and short story collection The 21 Dreams of Liang Wern Fook (21, 1992) showed a new direction for Singapore Chinese literature. These books recorded the changes in modes of feeling and expression brought about by the peer pressure and complexity of life in a post-modern society.

Today, Liang runs a Chinese language enrichment centre for primary and secondary school students, set up in 1997, with his wife He is also an adjunct associate professor in the Division of Chinese at Nanyang Technological University.

Liang is still involved in the music business through writing one to six songs a year. He would offer his work to the singer whom he thinks is most suitable for the tune. His most recent popular hit was Joi Chua's "Watch The Sunrise With Me", released in 2004.
In 2015, he created the theme song for Life- Fear Not.

In 2016, Liang released his first album in 24 years, I Hear The Sound of Dawn. It contains 15 tracks and features Singaporean singers such as Stefanie Sun, Joi Chua, Tay Kewei, Alfred Sim and younger performers ShiGGa Shay and Tosh Zhang.

Academic career
Liang went into academia in 1990, when the xinyao movement started to become more commercialised. While peers such as Eric Moo, Billy Koh and Lee Shih Shiong and his twin brother Wei Song ventured abroad or started their own music schools, Liang, instead, chose to pursue his PhD at the National Institute of Education, now part of Nanyang Technological University (NTU), writing a thesis on the poems of Tang dynasty poet Meng Haoran. He graduated with a PhD in Chinese studies in 1999.

Currently, Liang teaches once a week as an adjunct associate professor at NTU's Chinese studies department. He also lectures at the National University of Singapore and the National Institute of Education.

Honours
In 1988, Liang received gold medal awards from both the National University of Singapore's Arts and Social Sciences Faculty and the Nanyang Technological University's Chinese Studies Department.

In 1990, Liang was voted "Most Popular Writer" by local students in a poll organised by Lianhe Zaobao. In 1992, he received the National Arts Council's first Young Artist Award. He won the Singapore Book Prize in 1996. In a 2003 poll conducted by the Composers and Authors Society of Singapore (Compass), Liang was voted "Person Who Best Represents the Xinyao Spirit". The same poll placed seven of his songs among "the ten greatest xinyao songs", with "Friendship Forever" (细水长流) in top position.

In music, Liang's achievements include: Sing Music Highest Honour Award (1988), Xinyao Festival Best Lyrics and Music Award (1989), Singapore Hits Highest Honour Award (1994), Singapore Hits Best Local Lyrics Award (1995; 2001; 2003; 2005) and the Meritorious Award from Compass (1999), and Best Original TV Series Theme Song at the Asian Television Awards (2002), Outstanding Achievement Award(Music) at the Singapore Entertainment Awards(2010), Best TV Drama Theme Song Award at the Star Awards(2010).

In 2008, Liang was awarded the Alumni Achievement Award by NTU (of which the NIE is a part of).

In 2010, Liang was awarded the Singapore Cultural Medallion.

In 2012, Liang was honoured as "Special Artist of the Year" when Chingay Parade celebrated its 40th Anniversary.

See also
 Literature of Singapore
 Music of Singapore

Notes

References
 
 

Life - Fear Not

Singaporean writers
Academic staff of Nanyang Technological University
Singaporean composers
20th-century Singaporean male singers
Singaporean Mandopop singers
National University of Singapore alumni
Nanyang Technological University alumni
Hwa Chong Junior College alumni
Catholic High School, Singapore alumni
1964 births
Living people
Singaporean people of Cantonese descent
Recipients of the Cultural Medallion